John Hutchison Hester (11 September 1886 – 11 February 1976) was a major general in the United States Army who commanded the 43rd Infantry Division during World War II.

Early career

Hester was born on 11 September 1886 in Albany, Georgia. He attended University of Georgia, before entered the United States Military Academy at West Point, New York. Hester graduated in June 1908 and was commissioned second lieutenant of infantry. He was assigned to the Fort McPherson, Georgia, as his first assignment and served there until 1913.

Lieutenant Hester participated in the Pancho Villa Expedition in Mexico during 1916 and later was transferred to Washington, D.C., where he was assigned to the General Staff.

He served with the rank of lieutenant colonel as professor of military science & tactics at University of Minnesota until the end of September 1933, when he was appointed executive officer of the 65th Infantry Regiment in Puerto Rico. Hester spent the next two years there, before he was ordered back to the United States and assigned to the Operations and Plan Section at War Department General Staff. During his service there, he was promoted to the rank of colonel on 1 March 1937.

His next assignment was commanding officer of the 1st Infantry Regiment in August 1939. Hester simultaneously served as commanding officer of the Camp Jackson, South Carolina. He was subsequently transferred to the War Department, where he was appointed executive officer of the Reserves & Reserve Officers' Training Corps Affairs. During his service in this capacity, Hester was promoted to the rank of brigadier general on 1 November 1940.

World War II

At the end of March 1941, Brigadier General Hester was transferred to Camp Wheeler, Georgia, where he took command of the Infantry Replacement Training Center. In October 1941, Hester took command of the 43rd Infantry Division, where he relieved National Guard Major General Morris B. Payne. He was promoted to the rank of major general in February 1942.

The 43rd Division went overseas in October 1942 and participated in the landings at Russell and Rendova Islands. Hester commanded the 43rd Division during the attack on Munda Airport held by Japanese forces at the end of July 1943. However, he was relieved of command by Major General John R. Hodge on 29 July 1943. Official reason of his dismissal was "exhaustion of combat". Hester was subsequently sent back to the United States and granted two months leave for recovery. He was also decorated with Legion of Merit for the success in the initial stages of New Georgia Campaign.

General Hester was appointed commanding general of the Tank Destroyer Center at Camp Hood, Texas on 23 October 1943. His final assignment was post of commanding general of the Infantry Replacement Training Center at Camp Croft, South Carolina, where he arrived on 26 June 1944. He finally retired from the army on 28 February 1946 and was decorated with his second Legion of Merit for his service in this capacity.

Later life and death

Hester died in Atlanta on February 11, 1976, and was buried at Arlington Memorial Park in Sandy Springs, Georgia.

Decorations

References

External links
Generals of World War II

1886 births
1976 deaths
United States Army Infantry Branch personnel
People from Albany, Georgia
University of Georgia alumni
United States Military Academy alumni
United States Army Command and General Staff College alumni
United States Army War College alumni
United States Army personnel of World War I
Recipients of the Legion of Merit
United States Army generals of World War II
United States Army generals